Class II may refer to:
Class II antiarrhythmic
Class II appliance
Class II bacteriocin
Class II cabinet
Class II electrical appliance
Class II gaming
Class II gene
Class II PI 3-kinases
Class II railroad
Class II star
MHC class II

See also
 Class 2 (disambiguation)